Stefan Rexin (29 June 1957 – May 2019) was a Swedish footballer. Rexin made 1 Allsvenskan appearances for Djurgården 1986 and scored 0 goals.

References

Swedish footballers
Djurgårdens IF Fotboll players
Association footballers not categorized by position
1957 births
2019 deaths